Megachile flabellipes is a species of bee in the family Megachilidae. It was described by Theodosio De Stefani Perez in 1895.

References

Flabellipes
Insects described in 1895